Eupterote undata is a moth of the family Eupterotidae. It is found in Pakistan, India, Sri Lanka, Burma, Sumatra, Java and the Philippines.

The wingspan is about 70 mm for females and 65 mm for males. Adults are brownish-yellow or yellow with black double postmedial lines and various wavy black lines on the wings.

The larvae feed on Elettaria, Eugenia hemispherica, Coffea arabica, Maesa indica, Macaranga indica, Veronia arborea, Persea macrantha and Paulownia species.

References

Moths described in 1844
Eupterotinae